The following is a list of Cal Poly Mustangs football seasons for the football team that has represented California Polytechnic State University in NCAA competition.

Season–by–season records

References

Cal Poly

Cal Poly Mustangs football seasons